Moscow City Duma District 25 is one of 45 constituencies in Moscow City Duma. The constituency has covered parts of South-Eastern Moscow since 2014. From 1993 to 2005 District 25 was based in South-Western Moscow; however, after the number of constituencies was reduced to 15 in 2005, the constituency was eliminated.

Members elected

Election results

2001

|-
! colspan=2 style="background-color:#E9E9E9;text-align:left;vertical-align:top;" |Candidate
! style="background-color:#E9E9E9;text-align:left;vertical-align:top;" |Party
! style="background-color:#E9E9E9;text-align:right;" |Votes
! style="background-color:#E9E9E9;text-align:right;" |%
|-
|style="background-color:#1042A5"|
|align=left|Dmitry Katayev (incumbent)
|align=left|Union of Right Forces
|
|30.43%
|-
|style="background-color:"|
|align=left|Andrey Shcherbina
|align=left|Independent
|
|19.80%
|-
|style="background-color:"|
|align=left|Vladimir Rodin
|align=left|Communist Party
|
|19.39%
|-
|style="background-color:"|
|align=left|Sergey Mikhin
|align=left|Independent
|
|8.48%
|-
|style="background-color:"|
|align=left|Sergey Zagraevsky
|align=left|Independent
|
|3.72%
|-
|style="background-color:"|
|align=left|Vladimir Kishinets
|align=left|Independent
|
|3.43%
|-
|style="background-color:#000000"|
|colspan=2 |against all
|
|11.91%
|-
| colspan="5" style="background-color:#E9E9E9;"|
|- style="font-weight:bold"
| colspan="3" style="text-align:left;" | Total
| 
| 100%
|-
| colspan="5" style="background-color:#E9E9E9;"|
|- style="font-weight:bold"
| colspan="4" |Source:
|
|}

2014

|-
! colspan=2 style="background-color:#E9E9E9;text-align:left;vertical-align:top;" |Candidate
! style="background-color:#E9E9E9;text-align:left;vertical-align:top;" |Party
! style="background-color:#E9E9E9;text-align:right;" |Votes
! style="background-color:#E9E9E9;text-align:right;" |%
|-
|style="background-color:"|
|align=left|Lyudmila Stebenkova (incumbent)
|align=left|United Russia
|
|52.93%
|-
|style="background-color:"|
|align=left|Yekaterina Yengalycheva
|align=left|Communist Party
|
|16.62%
|-
|style="background-color:"|
|align=left|Anton Antonov-Ovseyenko
|align=left|Yabloko
|
|7.47%
|-
|style="background-color:"|
|align=left|Oleg Ananyev
|align=left|Independent
|
|7.46%
|-
|style="background-color:"|
|align=left|Natalya Meshcheryakova
|align=left|A Just Russia
|
|7.30%
|-
|style="background-color:"|
|align=left|Sergey Kozadayev
|align=left|Liberal Democratic Party
|
|5.03%
|-
| colspan="5" style="background-color:#E9E9E9;"|
|- style="font-weight:bold"
| colspan="3" style="text-align:left;" | Total
| 
| 100%
|-
| colspan="5" style="background-color:#E9E9E9;"|
|- style="font-weight:bold"
| colspan="4" |Source:
|
|}

2019

|-
! colspan=2 style="background-color:#E9E9E9;text-align:left;vertical-align:top;" |Candidate
! style="background-color:#E9E9E9;text-align:left;vertical-align:top;" |Party
! style="background-color:#E9E9E9;text-align:right;" |Votes
! style="background-color:#E9E9E9;text-align:right;" |%
|-
|style="background-color:"|
|align=left|Lyudmila Stebenkova (incumbent)
|align=left|Independent
|
|37.32%
|-
|style="background-color:"|
|align=left|Andrey Oryol
|align=left|Communist Party
|
|33.74%
|-
|style="background-color:"|
|align=left|Denis Merkulov
|align=left|Liberal Democratic Party
|
|9.55%
|-
|style="background: #00A650"| 
|align=left|Sergey Smirnov
|align=left|Civilian Power
|
|6.26%
|-
|style="background-color:"|
|align=left|Dmitry Rakitin
|align=left|Communists of Russia
|
|4.32%
|-
|style="background-color:"|
|align=left|Vladislav Kotsyuba
|align=left|A Just Russia
|
|2.85%
|-
|style="background-color:"|
|align=left|Stanislav Polishchuk
|align=left|Independent
|
|2.07%
|-
| colspan="5" style="background-color:#E9E9E9;"|
|- style="font-weight:bold"
| colspan="3" style="text-align:left;" | Total
| 
| 100%
|-
| colspan="5" style="background-color:#E9E9E9;"|
|- style="font-weight:bold"
| colspan="4" |Source:
|
|}

Notes

References

Moscow City Duma districts